Pongamiopsis is a genus of flowering plants in the legume family, Fabaceae. They are endemic to Madagascar.

Species:
 Pongamiopsis amygdalina
 Pongamiopsis pervilleana
 Pongamiopsis viguieri

References

Millettieae
Taxonomy articles created by Polbot
Fabaceae genera